The 2022 CRO Race was a road cycling stage race in Croatia between 27 September and 2 October 2022. It was the seventh edition of the Tour of Croatia since its revival in 2015 and the third under the CRO Race name. The race is rated as a category 2.1 event on the 2022 UCI Europe Tour calendar.

Teams 
Six of the 18 UCI WorldTeams, eight UCI ProTeams and six UCI Continental teams made up the 20 teams that will participated in the race.

UCI WorldTeams

 
 
 
 
 
 

 
UCI ProTeams

 
 
 
 
 
 
 
 

UCI Continental Teams

Route

Stages

Stage 1 

 27 September 2022 – Osijek to Ludbreg,

Stage 2 

 28 September 2022 – Otočac to Zadar,

Stage 3 

 29 September 2022 – Sinj to Primošten,

Stage 4 

 30 September 2022 – Biograd na Moru to Crikvenica,

Stage 5 

 1 October 2022 – Opatija to Labin,

Stage 6 

 2 October 2022 – Sveta Nedelja to Zagreb,

Classification leadership table 
In the 2022 CRO Race, four different jerseys were awarded. The general classification was calculated by adding each cyclist's finishing times on each stage, and applying time bonuses for the first three riders at intermediate sprints (three seconds to first, two seconds to second, and one second to third) and at the finish of mass-start stages; these were awarded to the first three finishers on all stages: the stage winner won a ten-second bonus, with six and four seconds for the second and third riders, respectively. The leader of the classification received a red jersey; it was considered the most important of the 2022 CRO Race, and the winner of the classification was considered the winner of the race.

Additionally, there was a points classification, for which the leader was awarded a blue jersey. In the points classification, cyclists received points for finishing in the top 15 of each stage. For winning a stage, a rider earned 25 points, with 20 for second, 16 for third, 14 for fourth, 12 for fifth, 10 for sixth, and a point fewer per place down to 1 point for 15th place. Points towards the classification could also be won on a 5–3–1 scale for the first three riders, respectively, at intermediate sprint points during each stage; these intermediate sprints also offered bonus seconds towards the general classification as noted above.

There was also a mountains classification, the leadership of which was marked by a green jersey. In the mountains classification, points towards the classification were won by reaching the summit of a climb before other cyclists. Each climb was marked as either hors, first, second, or third-category, with more points available for the higher-categorized climbs.

The fourth and final jersey represented the young rider classification, and its leadership was marked by a white jersey. This was decided in the same way as the general classification, but only riders born after 1 January 2000 (i.e., under 23 years of age at the beginning of the year) were eligible to be ranked in the classification. There was also a team classification, in which the times of the best three cyclists per team on each stage were added together; the leading team at the end of the race was the team with the lowest total time.

 On stage 2, Sacha Modolo, who was second in the points classification, wore the blue jersey, because first-placed Jonathan Milan wore the red jersey as the leader of the general classification. For the same reason Kim Heiduk who was second in the young rider classification, wore the white jersey.
 On stage 3, Pierre Barbier, who was second in the points classification, wore the blue jersey, because first-placed Jonathan Milan wore the red jersey as the leader of the general classification. For the same reason Axel Laurance who was second in the young rider classification, wore the white jersey.
 On stage 4, Jonas Vingegaard, who was second in the points classification, wore the blue jersey, because first-placed Jonathan Milan wore the red jersey as the leader of the general classification. For the same reason Axel Laurance who was second in the young rider classification, wore the white jersey.
 On stage 5, Axel Laurance, who was second in the points classification, wore the blue jersey, because first-placed Jonathan Milan wore the red jersey as the leader of the general classification. For the same reason Oscar Onley who was second in the young rider classification, wore the white jersey.

Final classification standings

General classification

Points classification

Mountains classification

Young rider classification

Team classification

References

Sources

External links 

 

2022 UCI Europe Tour
2022 in Croatian sport
September 2022 sports events in Croatia
October 2022 sports events in Croatia